Adrien Pouliot,  (January 4, 1896 –  March 10, 1980) was a Canadian mathematician and educator.

Born in Île d'Orléans, Quebec. He married Laure Clark and was cousin of André Hudon. He obtained a B.A. in applied sciences from the École Polytechnique de Montréal in 1919. He helped to create the department of mathematics at Université Laval where he began teaching in 1922. He was president of the Canadian Mathematical Society from 1949 to 1953. He was made a Companion of the Order of Canada in 1972. He was head of the Faculty of Science at Laval from 1940 to 1956. A building on the Laval campus has been named in his honour.

The Canadian Mathematical Society's Adrien Pouliot Award is named in his honour.

References
 
The Archives of Université Laval has important funds for him.

External links
 Adrien Pouliot at The Canadian Encyclopedia

1896 births
1980 deaths
Companions of the Order of Canada
Canadian mathematicians
Academic staff of Université Laval
Academics in Quebec
People from Capitale-Nationale
French Quebecers
Université Laval alumni
Presidents of the Canadian Mathematical Society